Sergi Palencia Hurtado (born 23 March 1996) is a Spanish professional footballer who plays as a right back for Major League Soccer club Los Angeles FC.

Club career

Barcelona
Born in Badalona, Barcelona, Catalonia, Spain, Palencia started playing football for hometown club Badalona at the age of 8, moving to Barcelona's youth system, La Masia, in 2006. In 2013, he was compared to Bayern Munich full back Philipp Lahm by Spanish newspaper Mundo Deportivo.

On 29 March 2015, while still a youth player, Palencia was called up to the Barcelona reserve team for a Segunda División match against Tenerife, and played his first match as a professional hours later, starting in a 1–1 home draw. He and Álex Grimaldo were sent off on 25 April 2015 in a 2–1 win over Ponferradina at the Mini Estadi. Palencia played eleven matches in a season which saw his team relegated to Segunda División B, scoring his first goal on 31 May in a 5–2 home loss to Leganés.

On 10 August 2016, Palencia was named the B-team's captain. He achieved promotion back to the second level at the end of the campaign, and renewed his contract until 2020 on 5 October 2017.

On 16 August 2018, Palencia joined Ligue 1 side Bordeaux in a season-long loan deal. He played 31 total games, starting on 19 August in the season-opening 2–1 loss at rivals Toulouse in the Derby de la Garonne.

Saint-Étienne
On 5 July 2019, Palencia joined Saint-Étienne for a fee of €2 million, with an additional €1 million in variables. Barcelona maintained 20% of his future transfer fee. On his debut on 1 September, a 1–0 loss at Marseille, he sprained his right ankle under a challenge from Jordan Amavi and was ruled out for six weeks.

On 28 September 2020, Palencia returned to Spain and its second division after agreeing to a one-year loan deal with Leganés. The following July, after playoff defeat to nearby Rayo Vallecano, his loan was extended for another year; he was out of Saint-Étienne manager Claude Puel's plans and the French club needed to balance the books.

Los Angeles FC
On 2 February 2023, Palencia joined Major League Soccer club Los Angeles FC, reunited him with former Saint-Étienne teammate Denis Bouanga.

Career statistics

Honours
Barcelona U19
 UEFA Youth League: 2013–14
Saint-Étienne

 Coupe de France runner-up: 2019–20

References

External links
FC Barcelona official profile

1996 births
Living people
People from Badalona
Sportspeople from the Province of Barcelona
Spanish footballers
Footballers from Catalonia
Association football defenders
Segunda División players
Segunda División B players
Ligue 1 players
Championnat National 3 players
CF Badalona players
FC Barcelona players
FC Barcelona Atlètic players
FC Girondins de Bordeaux players
CD Leganés players
AS Saint-Étienne players
Los Angeles FC players
Spain under-21 international footballers
Spanish expatriate footballers
Spanish expatriate sportspeople in France
Expatriate footballers in France
Spanish expatriate sportspeople in the United States
Expatriate soccer players in the United States